Yowamushi Pedal is written and illustrated by Wataru Watanabe, and the manga began serialization in the 12th issue of Akita Shoten's Weekly Shōnen Champion on February 21, 2008. The series was later published in tankōbon format by Akita Shoten, with the first volume being released on July 8, 2008. As of March 2023, 82 volumes have been published.

On August 8, 2013, a limited-edition version of the 29th volume of Yowamushi Pedal was released with a bundled anime DVD directed by Osamu Nabeshime and produced by TMS Entertainment.

The manga is published in English by Yen Press in North America, who are releasing the series as two-in-one omnibuses. The first omnibus volume was released on December 15, 2015.

The Yowamushi Pedal manga won the Best Shōnen Manga award along with The Seven Deadly Sins manga at the 39th Kodansha Manga Awards.

 

Yowamushi Pedal volumes
This is the first and main series of the manga which was written and illustrated by Wataru Watanabe. As of March 2023 the series was collected into 82 volumes and ongoing. The chapter numbering starts with "RIDE." followed by the chapter number. An anime television series adaptation aired from October 2013 to July 2014, followed by a second season aired from October 2014 to March 2015, a third season aired from January to June 2017 and a fourth season aired from January to June 2018. A live-action television drama adaptation aired in August 2016. A live-action film adaptation is set to release in August 2020.

Chapters not yet in Tankōbon format
RIDE.703 
RIDE.704 
RIDE.705 
RIDE.705.5 
RIDE.706 
RIDE.707 
RIDE.708 
RIDE.709 
RIDE.710 
RIDE.711 
RIDE.712 
RIDE.713

Yowamushi Pedal: Spare Bike volumes
First spin-off series written and illustrated by Wataru Watanabe. The series have started at 2012 and still ongoing. First it was serialized in Weekly Shōnen Champion magazine but later it was moved to Bessatsu Shōnen Champion. As of March 2023 the chapters have collected into 11 tankōbon (books). The series is present various side stories of the main characters. The chapter numbering starts with "SPARE." followed by the chapter number.

Chapters not yet in Tankōbon format
SPARE.119 
SPARE.120 
SPARE.121

After School Pedal volumes
The second spin-off series is a tribute for the series containing illustrations and stories by various writers and illustrators. As of August 2020 the series was collected into 8 tankōbon (books) and it is still ongoing.

Reference list

Yowamushi Pedal